Dragoș Cereș (born 2004) is a Moldovan chess player who holds the title of International Master (IM, 2022). He won Moldovan Chess Championship (2022).

Biography 
Dragoș Cereș multiple times won Moldovan Youth Chess Championships in various age groups: U10 (2014), U14 (2018) and U16 (2019). He participated in European Youth Chess Championships and World Youth Chess Championships. In 2019 Dragoș Cereș ranked in 2nd place in European School Chess Championship in U15 age group.

In 2022 Dragoș Cereș won Moldovan Chess Championship.

Dragoș Cereș played for Moldova in the Chess Olympiad:
 In 2022, at reserve board in the 44th Chess Olympiad in Chennai (+5, =3, -1).

In 2022, he was awarded the FIDE International Master (IM) title.

References

External links 

2004 births
Living people
Chess International Masters
Moldovan chess players